The 1925 Howard Bison football team was an American football team that represented Howard University during the 1925 college football season. In their second year under head coach Louis L. Watson, the Bison compiled a 6–0–2 record, did not allow a point to be scored by opponents, outscored opponents by a total of 140 to 0, and were recognized as the black college national champion.

Schedule

References

Howard
Howard Bison football seasons
Black college football national champions
College football undefeated seasons
Howard Bison football